The 1989 Manitoba municipal elections were held on October 25, 1989 to elect mayors, councillors and school trustees in various communities throughout Manitoba, Canada.

Cities

Brandon

Rural Municipalities

Rockwood

Note:  The official results in the Winnipeg Free Press list Docking as the elected member for the third ward, and Thievin as the elected member for the fourth.  Other sources, however, suggest that this was an error.

School Divisions

Mystery Lake

A 2003 newspaper article lists Paul Power as a consultant with Hobbs & Associates, working to maintain a rail line for the isolated community of Lynn Lake.
Ed Isaac and Richard Whidden were not re-elected in 1992.

Footnotes

Municipal elections in Manitoba
1989 elections in Canada
1989 in Manitoba
October 1989 events in Canada